BBSS may refer to:

Beaver Brae Secondary School, a secondary school in Kenora, Ontario, Canada
Bukit Batok Secondary School, a secondary school in Bukit Batok, Singapore